Blueberry Girl is a book by Neil Gaiman and Charles Vess. It was conceived as a poem of the same name, written in 2000 by Neil Gaiman for his goddaughter Tash, the daughter of his friend Tori Amos. In 2004, Neil Gaiman announced that Charles Vess was painting pictures to go with the poem, with the intention of publishing it as book.

The book was published in 2009 by HarperCollins.

Reception

The book was well received on release, with both the writing and drawing being praised. In 2009 it was selected for the Summer 2009 Kids List by the American Booksellers Association.

References

External links
 Book information at Mr Bobo's Remarkable Mouse Circus with chapter excerpt and note from author
 Browse inside Blueberry Girl at publisher's site

2009 children's books
2009 poems
2009 poetry books
Books by Neil Gaiman
Children's poetry books
HarperCollins books
American picture books